Vadakke Madhom popularly known as Brahmaswam Madham, is one of the four ancient South Indian  that propagate Adwaita or nondualism. Spiritual leader Adi Shankara's disciple Hasthamalakacharya started the Madhom. It is located at Thrissur city in Kerala, India. Totakacharya was the first Madhapathi (Head) of Vadakke Madhom.

References

Madhoms in Thrissur
Festivals in Thrissur district
Culture of Thrissur
Hindu pilgrimage sites in India
Religious organisations based in India
Hindu festivals in Kerala